American Airlines Flight 383 was a nonstop flight from New York City to Cincinnati on November 8, 1965. The aircraft was a Boeing 727, with 57 passengers, and 5 crew on board. The aircraft crashed on final approach to the Cincinnati/Northern Kentucky International Airport located in Hebron, Kentucky, United States. Only three passengers and one flight attendant survived the crash.

Aircraft
The aircraft involved was a Boeing 727-100 (registration number N1996), serial number 18901. The Boeing 727 was delivered to American Airlines on June 29, 1965, and had operated a total of 938 hours at the time of the accident.

Events leading to the crash
The flight was delayed for 20 minutes in New York. Until the landing attempt, the flight from New York to Cincinnati was uneventful. At 18:45 (6:45 PM) Eastern Standard Time, the crew contacted the airline via ARINC company radio to report a 19:05 (7:05 PM) estimated time of arrival at Cincinnati. The weather was fine near the airport except for thunder clouds developing northwest of the airport across the Ohio River valley. At 18:57 (6:57 PM), Flight 383 was cleared by the approach controller for a visual approach to Cincinnati's runway 18 (now runway 18C), and was advised of precipitation just west of the airport. The aircraft approached the airport from the southeast and turned to a northerly heading to cross the Ohio River. It turned west after crossing to the northern shore of the Ohio River, intending to make a final turn to southeast after crossing the Ohio River (which runs from northwest to southeast) again to the southern shore of the river. After that final turn, the aircraft would line up with the runway 18 of the airport to make the final approach.

At 18:58 (6:58 PM), the approach controller transferred Flight 383 to the Cincinnati tower frequency.  At 18:59 (6:59 PM), Flight 383 received clearance from the tower controller to land on runway 18.

Crash
The aircraft flew into thick clouds and a thunderstorm after flying toward the airport from the northwest. It descended more rapidly than it should have, without either pilot in the cockpit noticing. It descended to just 3 ft (per altimeter) above the airport while it was about 3 nm north of the airport. Its correct altitude should have been just below  at that time. It continued its descent into the Ohio River valley while crossing the river back to the southern shore. When it made its last turn to the southeast to line up with the runway, it flew into the wooded slopes of the valley 3 km north of the runway threshold in poor visibility, at an altitude of 225′ below the runway's elevation. It then exploded and was engulfed in flames.

Of the 62 people on board the aircraft, only four people (one flight attendant and three passengers) survived. One of the survivors was Israel Horowitz, an American record producer.

Investigation

The Civil Aeronautics Board (CAB) investigated the accident. CAB investigators concluded that the aircraft was working normally and fully under the control of the pilots at the time of the crash. The aircraft was not equipped with a cockpit voice recorder.  The flight data recorder showed the aircraft descended through  in the last 42 seconds before impact, a normal rate of descent for the landing phase of operation.  The CAB determined that the probable cause of the accident was the pilots' failure to properly monitor their altitude during a visual approach into deteriorating weather conditions.

It was later believed that the following factors might have contributed to the crash:

 The flight crew may have been confused about their true altitude, due to misinterpretation of the aircraft's drum-type altimeter after descending through 0 feet (relative to the airport altitude), or they may have had their hands full controlling the plane in severe weather and simply failed to notice the readings on the altimeter.
 A late departure from New York and the deteriorating weather at Cincinnati may have put pressure on the flight crew.
 Despite the rapidly deteriorating weather conditions, the flight crew chose to make a visual approach to the runway.

Aftermath
The estate of Samuel Creasy, one of the passengers who died aboard Flight 383, sued American Airlines for wrongful death.  American Airlines responded by filing a third-party complaint against the Federal Aviation Administration and the Weather Bureau, in an attempt to shift liability for the crash to meteorologists and air traffic controllers for failure to warn the pilots of inclement weather or revoke the visual approach clearance.  American Airlines also alleged that the accident was due to a downdraft rather than pilot error.  A jury found AA liable for the accident and awarded Creasy's family $175,000 plus funeral expenses, a decision that was upheld on appeal to the Fifth Circuit Court of Appeals.

Two years after the crash of Flight 383, TWA Flight 128 crashed on the same hill while on approach to Cincinnati under poor visibility conditions.

On December 13, 2017, Toni Ketchell, the surviving crew member, died.

American Airlines still uses flight number 383, although it now operates from New York to Miami with the Boeing 777-300.

See also
1961 Cincinnati Zantop DC-4 crash
American Airlines Flight 1420
Aviation safety
South African Airways Flight 228 (pilot error reading a drum-type altimeter on a Boeing 707)
Alitalia Flight 404
American Airlines Flight 383 (2016)
American Airlines Flight 965
Ariana Afghan Airlines Flight 701
TWA Flight 128, a Convair 880 that crashed near Flight 383 site

References

External links

 Full Civil Aeronautics Board report (Archive)
 Figure 1
 Figure 2
 Figure 3
 Figure 4
 Figure 5
 Table
 NTSB brief DCA66A0003
 Detail Description of the events and investigation of the crash from CASA Flight Safety Magazine (February 2006 issue)
 The last words of the flight crew
 NTSB brief on another American Airlines Flight 383 incident on June 16, 1993 (non-fatal)
 Photo of the accident aircraft

Aviation accidents and incidents in the United States in 1965
1965 in Kentucky
Airliner accidents and incidents in Kentucky
Airliner accidents and incidents caused by weather
Airliner accidents and incidents caused by pilot error
Airliner accidents and incidents involving controlled flight into terrain
383
Accidents and incidents involving the Boeing 727
Cincinnati/Northern Kentucky International Airport
November 1965 events in the United States